Joseph Castle Eversole (July 26, 1852 – April 15, 1888) was the assassinated leader of the Eversole side of the French-Eversole Feud. He had been also a delegate to the 1884 Republican National Convention.

Early life
Joe Eversole was born on July 26, 1852 to Cavalry (14th Kentucky) Major John C. Eversole (1828–1864) and Nancy Ann Duff (1828–1900). He was one of nine known children. The Eversole, Duff, Combs, and Cornett families were early settlers of what became Hazard, Perry County, Kentucky.

Joe is listed as both a 'merchant' and as practicing lawyer and media articles record him going to court in Hyden, Kentucky the morning of his assassination however no record is found of any legal degree. He owned a general store in Hazard. His father was also assassinated on May 2, 1864 when he was about 12 by Confederate forces. His Father-in-law, Josiah H. Combs would be assassinated by the same people that killed Eversole in 1894. He is listed as holding various positions as an elected official (on the school board and as sheriff) so there is little question he was a politician that served the Hazard, Perry County, Kentucky area.

He was married to Susan Combs (1855–1947) on May 31, 1871 and had seven children of which 5 lived to be adults.

Their children were:

 William C. Eversole (1873–1943)
 John Boyd Eversole (1875–1910)
 Lillie C. Eversole (1877–1878)
 Martha Alice Eversole (1878–1879)
 Dr. Chester Arthur Eversole (1881–1967)
 Clara Belle Eversole (1883–1967) married Ky politician William Manon Cornett and
 Harry Clay Eversole (1885–1939) sometimes referred to as 'One Arm Harry'

Delegate to the 1884 Republican National Convention

Because of Joseph C. Eversole's political activity in Eastern Kentucky, he was a delegate to the 1884 Republican National Convention held in June 1884. He was one of the delegates from the 10th district of Kentucky. He named one of his children (Dr. Chester Arthur Eversole) after US President Chester A. Arthur.

Feud and assassination
The individual arrested and hanged for the murder was known as 'Bad Tom' Smith. Joe Adkins was also implicated and he was later convicted for the 1894 assassination of Judge Josiah H. Combs. 'Bad Tom' said that the murders were committed on orders from the leader of the French faction, Benjamin Fulton French. Media of the time recorded 'Bad Tom' Smith's confession in detail. Several records written in 1889 (about a year after the assassination) said:

"Alice Combs was sweeping her yard about 4 miles north of Hazard.. Her son Nickolas Combs had gone to Hyden [Kentucky] from Hazard [Kentucky]. Alice's brother Josiah H. Combs was judge and Joseph Eversole, Nick's best friend, were going with him to attend court, the county seat of Leslie County, Kentucky. Nick was riding her [Alice Combs] horse..... About  from the house she found Nick lying by the side of the road. He had been shot several times and his eyes were shot out. Nick was still alive and lived for a few minutes after she found him. Joe Eversole had been shot about the same number of times of Nick. Joe Eversole was dead - Nick's mouth was full of blood and couldn't talk to his mother. Nick and his friend Joe Eversole were buried together in the same coffin and the same grave."

"On the same day, Susan Eversole was taking her three young children to church - Her two oldest sons were in Virginia studying at law school. Susan was serving dinner for the preacher when a man arrived and told them Joe Eversole had been killed. He came to take her to town. There was blood on the saddle of the horse he brought.  Nick Combs and Joe Eversole were murdered by men who ambushed them hidden behind a screen of bushes. Tom Smith later confessed and said that he walked out in the road to see if Nick Combs was dead - Nick said "Tom don't shoot me again you have already killed me". He then shot Nick's eyes out".

The June 28, 1895 Courier-Journal (Louisville, Kentucky) reported Mr. Smith saying:

"Then he helped kill Joe Eversole and Nick Combs. He said Joe Adkins shot first with a shotgun and he shot at them as they fell off their horses and then robbed Eversole's body of $30."

When asked why he did this he said in a separate article that he stole a horse from the Eversole's and that the Eversole's prosecuted him for this crime and 'he became their bitter enemy joining the French Faction'

In addressing the crowd, 'Bad Tom' Smith said:

"Friends, one and all, I want to talk to you a little before I die. My last words on earth to you are to take warning from my fate. bad whiskey and bad women have brought me where I am. I hope you ladies will take no umbrage at this, for I have told you the God's truth. To you, little children, who were the first to be blessed by Jesus, I will give this warning: Don't drink whiskey and don't do as I have done. I want everyone in this vast crowd who does not wish to do the things that I have done, and to put themselves in the place I know occupy to hold their hands'.

Final justice

A number of books outline that most people believed that B. Fulton French was responsible for the murders of Joseph C. Eversole, his father-in-law, Josiah Henry Combs, and many others. In 1913 (19 years after the death of Judge Josah Combs), French accidentally ran into Joe Eversole's widow, Susan Combs Eversole in the lobby of a hotel in Elkatawa, Kentucky (near Jackson, Kentucky). With Mrs. Eversole was her youngest son, Harry C. Eversole then 28 years old. When French spoke to Mrs. Eversole, Harry pulled out a revolver and aware that French wore a bullet proof vest - shot him in the spleen. French initially recovered from his wounds and the Court fined Harry C. Eversole $75 for disturbing the peace. Susan Eversole paid the fine. in 1915, a little over a year after the shooting, French died from complications from the wound and was buried at the Winchester Cemetery in Clark County. While French never went to prison for the crime of orchestrating the Eversole clan murders, Harry was never tried for Fulton French's murder.

Media articles

During the period from 1886 when notice arrived of Benjamin Fulton French amassing a private army to assassinate Joseph C. Eversole the public and media followed the twists and turns of the French-Eversole Feud and the various trials, battles, indictments, convictions, re-trials, and death of the participants. This is a list of the newspapers that ran articles about the war in order of appearance:

First Notice of Feud

June 30, 1886 Louisville Courier-Journal, Louisville, Ky Page 1
July 24, 1886 St. Louis Post Dispatch, St. Louis, Missouri Page 8
July 25, 1886 Topeka Daily Capital, Topeka Kansas, Page 1
August 24, 1886 The Republic, Columbus, Indiana, Page 1
August 25, 1886 Wilkes-Barre Record, Wilkes-Barre, PA, page 1
September 3, 1886 The Hickman Courier, Hickman, Ky, Page 1
November 16, 1886 St. Paul Globe, St. Paul, Minnesota, Page 1

The Peace Treaty

November 22, 1886 Newton Daily Republican, Newton, Kansas, Page 2
November 25, 1886 Scott Weekly Monitor, Scott, Kansas, Page 6
November 27, 1886 Phillipsburg Herald, Phillipsburg, Kansas, Page 1
December 2, 1886 Phillipsburg Herald, Phillipsburg, Kansas, Page 1
December 2, 1886 Greensboro North State, Greensboro, NC, Page 1

Assassination of Joseph C. Eversole

April 17, 1888 Louisville Courier-Journal, Louisville, Ky, Page 1
November 14, 1888 Decauter Herald, Decauter, Illinois, Page 1
November 14, 1888 Ottawa Daily Republic, Ottawa, Kansas, page 1
December 2, 1888 St. Louis Post Dispatch, St. Louis, Missouri, Page 6
December 21, 1888 Columbus Journal, Columbus, Nebraska, Page 2
December 21, 1888 Kingston Daily Freeman, Kingston, NY, Page 2
December 23, 1888 Democrat and Chronicle, Rochester, NY, Page 1
December 23, 1888 Galveston Daily News, Galveston, Texas, Page 3
December 23, 1888 St. Paul Globe, St. Paul, Minnesota, page 22
December 23, 1888 Detroit Free Press, Detroit, Michigan, page 3
December 24, 1888 Ottawa Daily Republic, Ottawa, Kansas, Page 2
December 27, 1888 Worthington Advance, Worthington, Minnesota, Page 2
January 28, 1889 St. Louis Post Dispatch, St. Louis, Missouri, page 5

Battle of Hazard

November 14, 1889 Salina Daily Republican, Salina, Kansas, Page 1
November 15, 1889 Lawrence Daily Journal, Lawrence, Kansas, Page 1
November 15, 1889 Times Picayune, New Orleans, Louisiana, Page 2
November 15, 1889 The Cincinnati Enquirer, Cincinnati, Ohio, Page 1
November 15, 1889 Detroit Free Press, Detroit, Michigan, Page 2
November 15, 1889 Arkansas City Daily Traveler, Arkansas City, Kansas, Page 8
November 15, 1889 Pittsburgh Daily Post, Pittsburgh, PA, Page 6
November 16, 1889 Scranton Republican, Scranton, PA, Page 1
November 16, 1889 The Times, Philadelphia, PA, Page 4
November 23, 1889 Ohio Democrat, Logan, Ohio, Page 2
December 21, 1889 People's Press, Winston-Salem, NC, Page 3

Continuing Bloodshed

August 10, 1890 St. Louis Post Dispatch, St. Louis, Missouri, Page 3
August 17, 1890 Independent Record, Helena, Montana, Page 9
August 29, 1890 The Tennessean, Nashville, TN, Page 1
August 29, 1890 Daily Arkansas Gazette, Little Rock, Arkansas, page 1
August 29, 1890 Indianapolis News, Indianapolis, Indiana, Page 1
August 30, 1890 Ironwood Times, Ironwood, Michigan, Page 1
September 1, 1890 Independent Record, Helena, Montana, Page 1
September 1, 1890 The Tennessean, Nashville, Tn, Page 1
September 1, 1890 Sandusky Register, Sandusky, Ohio, Page 1
September 2, 1890 Cincinnati Enquirer, Cincinnati, Ohio, Page 1
September 2, 1890 Detroit Free Press, Detroit, Michigan, Page 4
September 3, 1890 Somerset herald, Somerset, PA, page 2
September 3, 1890 The Republic, Columbus, Indiana, Page 1
September 4, 1890 The Onaga Herald, Onaga, Kansas, Page 1
September 7, 1890 Cincinnati Enquirer, Cincinnati, Ohio, Page 17
September 8, 1890 The World, New York City, New York, Page 11
September 11, 1890 The Index, Hermitage, Missouri, Page 1
September 12, 1890 Big Stone Gap Post, Big Stone Gap, VA, Page 3
September 19, 1890 Cincinnati Enquirer, Cincinnati, Ohio, Page 1
September 20, 1890 The Lima News, Lima, Ohio, Page 1
September 27, 1890 Chicago Daily Tribune, Chicago, Illinois, Page 4

Bad Tom Smith given Bail

November 24, 1890 McPherson Daily Republican, McPherson, Kansas, Page 4

Continuing Bloodshed

May 5, 1891 Scott Daily Monitor, Scott, Kansas, Page 1
May 8, 1891 Lebanon Daily News, Lebanon, PA, Page 1
February 28, 1892 St. Paul Globe, St. Paul, Minnesota, Page 16
November 7, 1892 San Francisco Call, San Francisco, CA, page 16

False reports that Josiah Combs elderly wife was murdered

May 21, 1893 Davenport Democrat and Leader, Davenport, Iowa, Page 9
May 25, 1893 Warren Sheaf, Warren, Minnesota, Page 3
May 25, 1893 Big Stone Gap Post, Big Stone Gap, VA, Page 3
June 1, 1893 Der Fortshritt (in German), New Ulm, Minnesota, Page 2
June 1, 1893 Princeton Union, Princeton, Minnesota, Page 2

Indictments, Trials and Acquittals

October 10, 1893 Louisville Courier-Journal, Louisville, KY, Page 4
December 15, 1893 Louisville Courier-Journal, Louisville, KY, Page 5

Judge Josiah Combs Targeted and killed

October 18, 1894 Atchison Daily Champion, Atchison, Kansas, Page 1
October 27, 1894 Perrysburg Journal, Perrysburg, Ohio, Page 2
December 12, 1894 New York Times, New York, New York, Page 1
December 12, 1894 Scranton Republican, Scranton, PA, page 2

More Trials, More indictments

January 24, 1895 Springfield Leader, Springfield, Missouri, Page 1
April 14, 1895 St. Louis Post Dispatch, St. Louis, Missouri, Page 21
April 14, 1895 Louisville Courier-Journal, Louisville, KY, Page 15
April 25, 1895 Louisville Courier-Journal, Louisville, KY Page 1
June 15, 1895 Alexandria Gazette, Alexandria, Virginia, Page 2

Bad Tom Smith Confesses

June 29, 1895 Daily Democrat, Huntington, Indiana, Page 1
June 29, 1895 Cincinnati Enquirer, Cincinnati, Ohio, Page 1 and 5
December 9, 1895 Cincinnati Enquirer, Cincinnati, Ohio, Page 1

December 16, 1895 Louisville Courier-Journal, Louisville, KY, Page 1
December 17, 1895 Reading Times, Reading, PA, Page 1
July 7, 1899 The Evening Times, Washington, DC, Page 3
June 6, 1903 The Pittsburgh Press, Pittsburgh, PA, Page 40

Fulton French Charged with Murder over Marcum case

March 4, 1904 Mountain Advocate, Barbourville, KY, Page 1
March 25, 1904 Hartford Republican, Hartford, KY, Page 2
August 17, 1906 Louisville Courier-Journal, Louisville, KY, Page 1
March 17, 1907 Cincinnati Enquirer, Cincinnati, Ohio, Page 27
March 24, 1907 Washington Times, Washington, DC, Page 44
June 17, 1907 Janesville Daily Gazette, Janesville, Wisconsin, Page 1
June 17, 1907 Kansas City Globe, Kansas City, Kansas, Page 1
June 17, 1907 Goldsboro Daily Argus, Goldsboro, NC, Page 1
November 30, 1907 The Pantagraph, Bloomington, Illinois, Page 1
December 10, 1907 Louisville Courier-Journal, Louisville, KY, Page 1
December 28, 1907 Paducah Evening Sun, Paducah, KY, Page 1
November 20, 1908 New York Times, New York, New York, Page 2
December 4, 1908 Hartford Republican, Hartford, Kentucky, Page 6

Fulton French and Mrs. Eversole meet

July 31, 1910 Louisville Courier-Journal, Louisville, KY, Page 12

Fulton French dies
January 6, 1915 Louisville Courier-Journal, Louisville, KY, Page 1
January 7, 1915 Louisville Courier-Journal, Louisville, KY, Page 4
January 7, 1915 Public Ledger, Maysville, KY, Page 4

References

1852 births
1888 deaths
Assassinated American politicians
Kentucky lawyers
Kentucky Republicans
Kentucky sheriffs
People from Hazard, Kentucky
19th-century American lawyers
Assassinated American former and incumbent party officials